Sthenias angustatus is a species of beetle, part of the family Cerambycidae. It was discovered and described by Maurice Pic in 1925.

References

angustatus
Beetles described in 1925